Heiseria is a genus of flowering plants belonging to the family Asteraceae.

It is native to Peru.

The genus name of Heiseria is in honour of Charles Bixler Heiser (1920–2010), an American professor of botany. It was first described and published in Bot. J. Linn. Soc. Vol.167 on page 327 in 2011.

Known species, according to Kew:
Heiseria irmscheriana 
Heiseria pusilla 
Heiseria simsioides

References

Asteraceae
Plants described in 2011
Flora of Peru
Asteraceae genera